Bonnie Devine is a Serpent River Ojibwa installation artist, performance artist, sculptor, curator, and writer from Serpent River First Nation, who lives and works in Toronto, Ontario. She is currently an associate professor at OCAD University and the founding chair of its Indigenous Visual Cultural Program.

Background
Bonnie Devine was born in Toronto and is a status member of the Serpent River First Nation. In 1997 Devine graduated from the Ontario College of Art and Design, with degrees in sculpture and installation, and she earned her Master of Fine Arts degree at York University in 1999. She has taught studio and liberal arts at York University, Queen's University, and the Centre for Indigenous Theatre. She joined OCAD University as a full-time instructor in 2008 and was a founding chair of the university's Indigenous Visual Culture program.

Artwork 
As a conceptual artist, Devine works with a variety of media, often combining traditional and unconventional materials. At a 2007 solo exhibition, Medicine River, at the Axéneo 7 art space in Quebec, she created eight-foot long knitting needles and knitted 250 feet of copper cable to bring attention to the contamination of the Kashechewan water system. She has fashioned full-sized canoes from paper and works with natural materials such as reeds in her 2009 piece, New Earth Braid. She also created land-based installations.

Devine's work is also primarily influenced by "the stories, technologies, and arts of the Ojibwa people."

Exhibitions
Devine's work has been exhibited in solo and group exhibitions in Canada, the U.S., South America, Russia and Europe.  Her 2010 solo exhibition, Writing Home, curated by Faye Heavyshield, was reviewed in Border Crossings.  A solo exhibition of Devine's work, Bonnie Devine: The Tecumseh Papers was held at the Art Gallery of Windsor from September 27, 2013, to January 5, 2014.  Her work is featured in the Art Gallery of Ontario's exhibition Before and after the Horizon: Anishinaabe Artists of the Great Lakes.

Awards and recognition
Devine has received numerous awards, including 2002 Best Experimental Video at the imagineNATIVE Film + Media Arts Festival, the Toronto Arts Awards Visual Arts Protégé Award in 2001, the Curry Award from the Ontario Society of Artists in 1999, a variety of awards from the Ontario College of Art and Design, as well as many grants and scholarships. She has been chosen for the 2011 Eiteljorg Museum fellowship. She received a Governor General's Award in Visual and Media Arts in 2021.

Published work
 Devine, Bonnie, Duke Redbird, and Robert Houle. The Drawings and Paintings of Daphne Odjig: A Retrospective Exhibition. Ottawa: National Gallery of Canada, 2007. .

Notes

References
 Fox, Suzanne G. and Lucy R. Lippard, eds. Path Breakers: The Eiteljorg Fellowship for Native American Fine Art, 2003. Indianapolis, IN: Eiteljorg Museum of American Indians and West, 2004. .

External links
 Bonnie Devine, timeline of images at the Centre for Contemporary Canadian Art
 Station Gallery Artists Interview: Bonnie Devine - Medicine Basket, Body Bags
 Bonnie Devine at The Canadian Encyclopedia, accessed September 5, 2019

Living people
Ojibwe people
First Nations installation artists
Women installation artists
First Nations conceptual artists
First Nations sculptors
First Nations performance artists
First Nations filmmakers
First Nations women writers
Artists from Toronto
Writers from Toronto
York University alumni
OCAD University alumni
People from Algoma District
Canadian women artists
1952 births
21st-century First Nations writers
21st-century Canadian women writers
Women video artists
21st-century Canadian women artists
Canadian women sculptors
Women performance artists
Women conceptual artists
21st-century Canadian sculptors
Canadian video artists
Governor General's Award in Visual and Media Arts winners
First Nations women artists